John Henry Davis (18 October 1876 – 20 April 1944) was an Australian rules footballer who played with South Melbourne in the Victorian Football League (VFL).

Notes

External links 

1876 births
1944 deaths
Australian rules footballers from Victoria (Australia)
Sydney Swans players